Boomarang Diner is a full-service, 1950s-style American restaurant chain specializing in freshly made hamburgers, chicken fried steak, chicken and breakfast served all day. There are currently 54 Boomarang Diner locations, all of which are located in Oklahoma.

Boomarang Diner was named the 2015 Restaurant of the Year by the Made In Oklahoma Coalition.

History
The first Boomarang Diner was opened by Charles Degraffenreid in 1998 in Muskogee, Oklahoma. That original diner, located on Eastside Boulevard, is still open. Two additional locations were opened in Muskogee before the franchise expanded across the state of Oklahoma. In December 2017, the 50th Boomarang Diner debuted in Holdenville, Oklahoma. In 2018, additional locations opened in Ponca City, Kingfisher and Bartlesville, Oklahoma.

The Boomarang Diner Trademark and Franchise is owned by Boomarang Diners, Inc., with corporate offices located in Shawnee, Oklahoma.

Charles Degraffenreid's sons, Steve and Ron Degraffenreid, manage the franchise and corporation.

Decor 

Boomarang's decor is reminiscent of the traditional "soda shops" and diners of 1950s. Pop icons of the era, as well as historic photos from local communities, can be found in every location.

Menu
Boomarang Diner is known primarily for its hamburgers and breakfasts, which are made to order all day. Other menu items include chicken, reuben and club sandwiches, salads, and a selection of popular appetizers, such as Pickle-o's, fried mushrooms and bacon cheese fries.

References

External links
 

Restaurant chains in the United States
Fast-food franchises
1990s establishments in Oklahoma
Pottawatomie County, Oklahoma
Muskogee, Oklahoma